The 2001 Ohio State Buckeyes football team represented Ohio State University in the 2001 NCAA Division I-A football season. It marked their first season under new head coach Jim Tressel. The Buckeyes compiled a 7–5 record, capped by a 26–20 victory over their rival the Michigan Wolverines in Ann Arbor in the regular season finale. The Buckeyes went on to play in the 2002 Outback Bowl in Tampa, Florida, where they lost, 31–28, to the South Carolina Gamecocks.

Preseason
The 2001 Ohio State Buckeyes football season marked a transition from former head coach John Cooper to new head coach Jim Tressel. Tressel was beginning his first season as head coach at the Division I-A level as the 22nd head coach of the Buckeyes.  He came from Youngstown State University where he led the Penguins to four national championships at the Division I-AA level.  The Buckeyes finished the 2000 season with an 8–4 record and Coach Cooper was later fired on January 2, 2001.

Prior to Cooper's firing, the Buckeyes were ranked 23rd in the AP Poll, losing in the 2001 Outback Bowl to the South Carolina Gamecocks by a score of 24–7.

Schedule

Roster

Coaching staff
 Jim Tressel - Head Coach (1st year)
 Jim Bollman - Offensive Line/OC (1st year)
 Ken Conaster - Special Teams (1st year)
 Bill Conley - Tight Ends / Recruiting Coordinator (15th year)
 Joe Daniels - Quarterbacks (1st year)
 Mark Dantonio - Defensive Coordinator (1st year)
 Jim Heacock - Defensive Line (6th year)
 Mark Snyder - Defensive Linebackers (1st year)
 Tim Spencer - Running Backs (8th year)
 Mel Tucker - Defensive Backs (1st year)
 Bob Tucker - Director of Football Operations (7th year)
 Dick Tressel - Associate Director of Football Operations (1st year)

Depth chart

Source: Athletic Department official site, 2001 football archive 12-01 depth chart

Game summaries

Akron

UCLA

Indiana

Northwestern

Wisconsin

San Diego State

Penn State

Minnesota

Purdue

Illinois

Michigan

2002 Outback Bowl

Rankings

2002 NFL draftees

References

Ohio State
Ohio State Buckeyes football seasons
Ohio State Buckeyes football